Forestdale is a village and historic district in North Smithfield, Providence County, Rhode Island, United States, one-half mile from Slatersville, Rhode Island. The historic district runs east and west along Main Street and north on Maple Avenue. School Street is the primary road through the village, and the one-room schoolhouse for which the street is named still stands. The Branch River runs through the valley adjacent to the School Street.  The Village Haven Restaurant and local VFW chapter are also located in the village.

History
The village was originally owned by the Forestdale Manufacturing Company, a textile mill, later purchased by John Slater & Co.  The Mansfield & Lamb scythe-shop manufactured scythes and later tools in Forestdale starting in 1824, and during the American Civil War manufactured swords and sabres for Union Forces. The mills used water power from the Branch River to power their equipment.

See also 
 National Register of Historic Places listings in Providence County, Rhode Island

References

Further reading
Walter Nebiker, The History of North Smithfield (Somersworth, NH: New England History Press, 1976).

External links
Forestdale History

Historic districts in Providence County, Rhode Island
Historic districts on the National Register of Historic Places in Rhode Island
National Register of Historic Places in Providence County, Rhode Island
North Smithfield, Rhode Island
Providence metropolitan area
Villages in Providence County, Rhode Island
Villages in Rhode Island